Brook Meadow (Emsworth) is a   Local Nature Reserve in Emsworth in Hampshire. It is owned by Havant Borough Council and managed by Brook Meadow Conservation Group.

Most of this site is grassland, which is surrounded by woodland and flanked by two streams. The diverse wildlife includes water voles.

References

Local Nature Reserves in Hampshire
Emsworth